The assassination of Rajiv Gandhi, former Prime Minister of India, occurred as a result of a suicide bombing in Sriperumbudur in Tamil Nadu, India on 21 May 1991. At least 14 others, in addition to Rajiv Gandhi, were killed. It was carried out by Kalaivani Rajaratnam (popularly known by her assumed names Thenmozhi Rajaratnam and Dhanu), a member of the Sri Lankan Tamil separatist organization Liberation Tigers of Tamil Eelam (LTTE) along with Jagjit Singh Chohan of the National Council of Khalistan (NCK) and Gurjant Singh Budhsinghwala of the Khalistan Liberation Force. At the time, India had just ended its involvement, through the Indian Peace Keeping Force, in the Sri Lankan Civil War. Subsequent accusations of conspiracy have been addressed by two commissions of inquiry and have brought down at least one national government, the government of Inder Kumar Gujral.

Assassination
 

Rajiv Gandhi was busy election-campaigning with G.K. Moopanar in southern states of India. On 21 May, after campaigning in Visakhapatnam, Andhra Pradesh, his next stop was Sriperumbudur, Tamil Nadu. About two hours after arriving in Madras (now Chennai), Gandhi was driven by motorcade in a white Ambassador car to Sriperumbudur, stopping along the way at a few other election campaigning venues. When Rajiv reached a campaign rally in Sriperumbudur, he left his car and began walking towards the dais where he was to deliver a speech. Along the way, he was garlanded by many well-wishers, Indian National Congress workers and school children. The assassin, Kalaivani Rajaratnam, approached and greeted him. She then bent down to touch his feet and detonated an RDX explosive-laden belt tucked below her dress at exactly 10:10 PM. Gandhi, his assassin and 14 others were killed in the explosion that followed, along with 43 others who were grievously injured. The assassination was caught on film by a local photographer, Haribabu, whose camera and film was found intact at the site despite him also dying in the blast.

Victims 
Apart from the suicide bomber Kalaivani Rajaratnam, several people were killed in the blast on 21 May 1991:
 Rajiv Gandhi, former Prime Minister of India
 Dharman, police constable
 Santhani Begum, Mahila Congress Leader
 Rajguru, police inspector
 Chandra, police constable
 Edward Joseph, police inspector
 K.S Mohammed Iqbal, police superintendent
 Latha Kannan, Mahila Congress worker, who was with her daughter Kokilavani
 Kokilavani, ten-year-old daughter of Latha Kannan, who sang a poem to Gandhi immediately before the blast
 Darryl Jude Peters, attendee and observer
 Munuswamy, former member of the Tamil Nadu Legislative Council
 Saroja Devi, seventeen-year-old college student
 Pradeep K Gupta, personal security officer of Rajiv Gandhi
 Ethiraju
 Murugan, police constable
 Ravichandran, Black Cat commando

Around forty-three bystanders including police sub-inspector Anushiya Daisy were also injured in the explosion.

Security lapses

The Supreme Court held that the decision to eliminate Gandhi was precipitated by his interview to Sunday magazine (21–28 August 1990), where he stated that he would send the IPKF to disarm the LTTE if he returned to power. Gandhi also defended the signing of the Indo-Sri Lanka accord in the same interview. The LTTE decision to kill him was perhaps aimed at preventing him from coming to power again. Thereafter, the Justice J. S. Verma Commission was formed to look into the security lapses that contributed to the killing.

The final report, submitted in June 1992, concluded that the security arrangements for the former PM were adequate but that the local Congress party leaders disrupted and broke these arrangements.

The Narasimha Rao government initially rejected Verma's findings but later accepted it under pressure. However, no action was taken on the recommendations of the commission.

Despite no action, the findings raised vital questions that have previously been consistently raised by political analysts. Sources have indicated that Gandhi was repeatedly informed that there was a threat to his life and that he should not travel to Tamil Nadu. In fact, the then governor of Tamil Nadu Bhishma Narain Singh, broke official protocol and twice warned Gandhi about the threat to his life if he visited the state.

Subramanian Swamy said in his book, Sri Lanka in Crisis: India's Options (2007), that an LTTE delegation had met Rajiv Gandhi on 5 March 1991. Another delegation met him around 14 March 1991 in New Delhi.

Journalist Ram Bahadur Rai wrote that:
The message conveyed to Rajiv Gandhi by both these delegations was that there was no threat to his life and that he can travel to Tamil Nadu without fearing for his life. I did a series of articles after his assassination that pointed out how, after these meetings, Rajiv became complacent about his security and broke security rules in more than 40 rallies.

Funeral

Following his assassination, Rajiv Gandhi's mutilated body was airlifted to New Delhi. From the Indira Gandhi International Airport, his body was sent to the All India Institute of Medical Sciences in New Delhi for an autopsy, reconstruction and embalming.

A state funeral was held for Rajiv Gandhi on 24 May 1991. His funeral was broadcast live nationally and internationally, and was attended by dignitaries from over 60 countries. He was cremated on the banks of the river Yamuna, near the cremation spot of his mother, brother and grandfather. Today, the site where he was cremated is known as Veerbhumi.

Investigation
Immediately after the assassination, the Chandrasekhar government handed the investigation over to the CBI on 22 May 1991. The agency created a special investigation team under D. R. Karthikeyan to determine who was responsible for the assassination. The SIT probe confirmed the role of the LTTE in the assassination, which was upheld by the Supreme Court of India.

The interim report of Justice Milap Chand Jain, looking into the conspiracy angle to the assassination, indicted the DMK for colluding with the LTTE. The report concluded that the DMK had provided sanctuary to the LTTE, which made it easier for the rebels to assassinate Rajiv Gandhi.

The Commission report stated that the year 1989 signified "the perpetuation of the general political trend of indulging the Tamil militants on Indian soil and tolerance of their wide-ranging criminal and anti-national activities". The report also alleged that LTTE leaders in Jaffna were in possession of sensitive coded messages exchanged between the Union government and the state government of DMK. "There is evidence to show that, during this period, some of the most vital wireless messages were passed between the LTTE operatives based in Tamil Nadu and Jaffna. These messages, which were decoded later, are directly related to the assassination of Rajiv Gandhi", the report stated. The Congress subsequently brought down the United Front (UF) government of I K Gujral after the report was leaked in November 1998. The party also demanded the removal of DMK from the UF government, arguing that it had played a key role in the death of Rajiv Gandhi.

Dr Jagjit Singh Chohan had helped with logistical and tactical support to the Tamil Tigers. His involvement was only declared in 2016 after about a 15-year speculation. This was evidence to the Jain Committee's report and suspicions that the LTTE had contacted Gurjant Singh Budhsinghwala along with Jagjit Singh Chohan to plan the plot.

"LTTE and Punjab ultras spoke of a plan to assassinate Rajiv."

- Sewa Dass Singh, Phiruman Akali Dal leader (1992)

Perpetrator
The assassination was carried out by Kalaivani Rajaratnam. She was born on 1 January 1974 in Sri Lanka. It was after joining the LTTE that she came to be known by the assumed name Thenmozhi. She was from Kupukullai in Jaffna, and studied until middle school in Batticaloa. She was inspired by the Tamil militant group Liberation Tigers of Tamil Eelam (Tamil Tigers) at a young age, and joined the Black Tigers (suicide bombers). The main reason why Dhanu became a Tiger is that her brother was a well-known cadre who had died and she was carrying on the family tradition. Thenmozhi was the daughter of a Sri Lankan Tamil man named A. Rajaratnam and his second wife. He allegedly was described as  Velupillai Prabhakaran's mentor; and he played a vital role in moulding the LTTE chief's thinking during the movement's formative years between 1972 and 1975. Marital status of Thenmozhi at the time of her death, is not known to the general public. Thenmozhi was survived by her mother, brother Sivavarman and two sisters, one of whom moved to France.

The court convicted and sentenced the seven persons who facilitated the assassination of Rajiv Gandhi to life imprisonment. They are currently undergoing life imprisonment in prisons in India. They are:
 Murugan alias Sriharan - A LTTE operative from Sri Lanka
 Nalini - Wife of Murugan. Nalini is a citizen of India. 
 Santhan alias T. Suthenthiraraja - A Sri Lankan national.
 Robert Pious - A Sri Lankan national.
 Jayakumar - The brother in law of Robert Pious. 
 Ravichandran - A Sri Lankan national.
 A. G. Perarivalan - An Indian citizen who was arrested for supplying a 9-volt battery for the explosive device.
On November 11, 2022,  the Supreme Court of India ordered the release of six convicts in the 1991 Rajiv Gandhi assassination case, after the Tamil Nadu government controversially recommended their remission in March 2016. The release of the six convicts came months after the Supreme Court on May 18 ordered the release of AG Perarivalan, the first of the seven convicts in the case, on grounds of poor health and good conduct.

Supreme Court judgment
As per the Supreme Court of India judgment, by Judge K. T. Thomas, the killing was carried out due to personal animosity of the LTTE chief Prabhakaran towards Rajiv Gandhi arising from his sending the Indian Peace Keeping Force (IPKF) to Sri Lanka and the alleged IPKF atrocities against Sri Lankan Tamils. Additionally, the Rajiv Gandhi administration had antagonised other Tamil militant organisations like PLOTE for reversing the military coup in Maldives back in 1988.

The judgment further cited the death of Thileepan in a hunger strike and the suicide by 12 LTTE cadres in a vessel in October 1987. While convicting the accused, four of them to death and others to various jail terms, the judgment stated that no evidence existed that any one of the conspirators ever desired the death of any Indian other than Rajiv Gandhi, though several others were killed. Judge Wadhwa further stated there was nothing on record to show that the intention to kill Rajiv Gandhi was to overawe the government. Hence it was held that it was not a terrorist act under TADA (Act). Judge Thomas further stated that conspiracy was hatched in stages commencing from 1987 and that it spanned several years. The special investigation team of India's premier special investigation agency Central Bureau of Investigation was not able to pinpoint when the decision to kill Rajiv Gandhi was taken.

Trial
The trial was conducted under the Terrorist and Disruptive Activities Act. On 28 January 1998, the designated TADA court in Chennai gave death sentences to all the 26 accused. This created a storm in India. Legal experts were divided. Human rights groups protested that the trial did not meet the standards of a free trial. The trial was held behind closed doors, in camera, and the identity of witnesses was not disclosed.  Ms A. Athirai, an accused, was 17 years old when she was arrested.

Under the TADA an accused can appeal only to the Supreme Court. Appeal to the High Court is not allowed as in normal law. Confessions given by the accused to the Superintendent of Police are taken as evidence against the accused under TADA. Under TADA the accused could be convicted on the basis of evidence that would have been insufficient for conviction by an ordinary court under normal Indian law. In the Rajiv Gandhi case, confessions by the accused formed a major part of the evidence in the judgment against them which they later claimed was taken under duress.

On appeal to the Supreme Court, only four of the accused were sentenced to death and the others to various jail terms. S Nalini Sriharan is the lone surviving member of the five-member squad behind the assassination of Rajiv Gandhi and is serving life imprisonment. Arrested on 14 June 1991, she was sentenced to death, along with the other 25 accused. However, the court confirmed that the death sentence was given to only four of the convicts, including Nalini, on 11 May 1999. Nalini, who is the wife of an LTTE operative known as V Sriharan alias Murugan, another convict in the case who had been sentenced to death, later gave birth to a girl, Harithra Murugan in prison. Upon the intervention of Rajiv Gandhi's widow and Congress president Sonia Gandhi, who petitioned for clemency for the sake of Nalini's daughter in 2000, the death sentence was commuted to life imprisonment. Nalini was treated as a class 'A' convict from 10 September 1999 till the privilege was withdrawn in May 2010 after a mobile phone was allegedly recovered from her cell during a surprise check. She "regrets" the killing of the former Prime Minister and claims that the real conspirators have not been booked yet. The President of India rejected the clemency pleas of Murugan and two others on death row, T Suthendraraja alias Santhan and A G Perarivalan alias Arivu in August 2011. The execution of the three convicts was scheduled for 9 September 2011. However, the Madras High Court intervened and stayed their execution for eight weeks based on their petitions. Nalini was shifted back to Vellore prison from Puzhal prison amidst tight security on 7 September 2011. In 2010, Nalini had moved the Madras High Court seeking release as she had served more than 20 years in prison. She argued that even life convicts were released after 14 years. However, the state government rejected her request. Murugan, Santhan and Perarivalan, the three convicts condemned to death, claimed that they were not ordinary criminals but political prisoners.

Jain Commission and other reports
In the Jain report, various people and agencies are named as suspected of having been involved in the murder of Rajiv Gandhi. Among them, the cleric Chandraswami was suspected of involvement, including financing the assassination. One of the accused, Ranganath, said Chandraswami was the godfather who financed the killing. Sikh Militants were also suspected, later proven true. In 1998, it was published in a newspaper that an interim report by the Jain commission made reference to a letter citing unverified information that Queen Aishwarya Rajya Lakshmi Devi Shah of Nepal had asked a courtier general of King Birendra Bir Bikram Shah Dev of Nepal, "to arrange for the assassination of Shri Rajiv Gandhi…(for which) Rs 10 crore would be made available.” Also included in the report are said to be the drunken utterances of a policeman confirming the matter. The interim report of the Jain Commission created a storm when it accused M. Karunanidhi the former Chief Minister of Tamil Nadu of a role in the assassination, leading to Congress withdrawing its support for the I. K. Gujral government and fresh elections in 1998.  Also other strong LTTE sympathizers Vaiko with MDMK and Thol. Thirumavalavan with VCK have supported Congress under Sonia Gandhi in the past. Vaiko left the UPA alliance before the 2009 election, partly due to the Sri Lankan issue.

In a report published on 30 October 2012 in DNA, K. Ragothaman, former chief investigator of the CBI, talks about his new book Conspiracy to Kill Rajiv Gandhi: From the CBI Files and tells the reporter that while the CBI had started a preliminary inquiry in which M. K. Narayanan, former West Bengal Governor and former Intelligence Bureau director, was named a suspect in hiding evidence, the case was buried by the CBI SIT Chief, D. R. Karthikeyan. In an interview in 2017, Justice K.T. Thomas had said that "there were serious flaws" in the CBI's investigation, particularly related to the seizure of Rs. 40 lakh in cash from the convicts, which led him to believe that the probe exposed "an unpardonable flaw" in the "Indian criminal justice system".

In the 2001 Norway peace talks, Prabhakaran told the press that the assassination of Rajiv Gandhi was a sorrowful event.
In 2006, LTTE spokesman Anton Balasingham told the Indian television channel NDTV that the killing was a "great tragedy, a monumental historical tragedy which we deeply regret".

Months before the assassination, Vazhappady K. Ramamurthy, who served as the president of Tamil Nadu Congress Committee from 1989 to 1994, produced a letter, purportedly from the LTTE threatening to kill him and Rajiv Gandhi, who had called for a tight clamp down of the LTTE activities in Tamil Nadu. The letter signed LTTE written in Tamil said that they had received orders from the leadership to eliminate people opposing their "Eelam struggle". The letter further said the following:

In a 2011 interview, Kumaran Pathmanathan, who was the Treasurer of LTTE and its chief arms procurer, apologized to India for Velupillai Prabhakaran's "mistake" of killing former Prime Minister Rajiv Gandhi. He further said Rajiv's assassination was "well planned and done actually with Prabhakaran and (LTTE intelligence chief Pottu Amman). Everyone knows the truth".

In 2016, solid evidence of the involvement of Dr Jagjit Singh Chohan and Gurjant Singh Budhsinghwala were given. In 1995, Sewa Dass Singh had seen Tamil separatists at Chohan's office a month before the assassination. Two other retrieved messages showed how he was in touch with Budhsinghwala about the assassination as well, and they were originally trying to find Haryanvis to assassinate Rajiv Gandhi instead of Tamils and Sikhs.

Memorial and popular culture

 The Rajiv Gandhi Memorial was built on the site, and is one of the major tourist attractions in the small industrial town.
 Assassination of Rajiv Gandhi: Unanswered Questions and Unasked Queries by Subramanian Swamy
 Conspiracy to Kill Rajiv Gandhi - from CBI Files by the Central Bureau of Investigation officer and chief investigating officer of the assassination case.
 Beyond the Tigers: Tracking Rajiv Gandhi's Assassination by Rajeev Sharma.
 Bypass: Flaws in the Forensic Investigation of Rajiv Gandhi Murder, the first open source feature film from India.

Films
 Kuttrapathirikai
 Mission 90 Days
 The Terrorist
 Cyanide
 Madras Cafe

Notes

References

Further reading
 State of Tamil Nadu through Superintendent of police, CBI/SIT v/s Nalini and 25 others.
 Blakeslee, David S. "Politics and public goods in developing countries: Evidence from the assassination of Rajiv Gandhi." Journal of Public Economics 163 (2018): 1-19 online.
 Gopal, Neena. The Assassination of Rajiv Gandhi (Penguin Random House India, 2017).
  Harish M, The Assassination of Rajiv Gandhi & Involvement of Sikh Extremists (2020)  excerpt
 Kaarthikenyan, D. R., and Radhavinod Raju. Rajiv Gandhi Assassination (Sterling Publishers Pvt. Ltd, 2008). online
 Roberts, Michael. "Killing Rajiv Gandhi: Dhanu's sacrificial metamorphosis in death." South Asian History and Culture 1.1 (2009): 25-41 online.
 Rudolph, Lloyd I. "Why Rajiv Gandhi's Death Saved the Congress: How an Event Affected the Outcome of the 1991 Election in India." in India Votes (Routledge, 2019) pp. 436–454.

External links
Harithra Murugan, daughter of Nalini Sriharan and Murugan interview

 
Suicide bombings in 1991
Deaths by person in India
Suicide bombings in India
Mass murder in 1991
May 1991 events in Asia
May 1991 crimes
Terrorist incidents in India in 1991
1991 in India
Assassinations in India
Crime in Tamil Nadu
Sri Lankan Civil War casualties
1990s in Tamil Nadu
Rajiv Gandhi
Filmed assassinations
1991 murders in India
People killed during the Sri Lankan Civil War
Indian Peace Keeping Force
Attacks on civilians attributed to the Liberation Tigers of Tamil Eelam